Fopp may refer to:

 "Fopp" (song), a 1975 song by the Ohio Players from Honey
 Fopp (EP), a 1988 EP by Soundgarden, featuring the song of the same name
 Screaming Life/Fopp, a 1990 compilation album by the American rock band Soundgarden
 Fopp (retailer), a British entertainment retailer
 Michael A. Fopp, Director General of the Royal Air Force Museum